Esaïe Djikoloum (born 3 October 1991) is a Chadian footballer who plays as a striker for CotonTchad.

Career 

In 2005-2006 he scored 14 goals in 22 matches. At the age of 14, he was the youngest goalking ever. Djikoloum have won Chadian league with RFC in 2007. In 2009, Esaïe won Chad Cup and Coupe de Ligue de N'Djaména with CotonTchad, and then played in 2010 CAF Confederation Cup preliminary round. He is the captain of CotonTchad.

International career 

At the age of 16, Djikoloum represented his home land at African Cup of Nations, in August 2006. In September 2006 he played with the Olympic team in the Zone IV (ACNOA) in Congo (Brazzaville). In 2007, he played his second African Cup of Nations.

He debuted for Chadian senior team in a match against South Africa on 2 June 2007. Until now, he earned 8 FIFA official and two unofficial caps.

See also 

 List of Chad international footballers

References

External links 

 
 

1991 births
Living people
Chadian footballers
Chad international footballers
People from N'Djamena
Association football forwards